Ray Smith may refer to:

Sportspeople
Ray Smith (racewalker) (1929–2010), Australian Olympic athlete
Ray Smith (cricketer) (1914–1996), English cricketer
Ray Smith (Australian footballer) (born 1948), Australian rules footballer from Queensland
Ray Smith (center) (1908–1984), American football player
Ray Smith (running back) (born c. 1937), American football player
Ray Smith (American football coach) (born 1938), American football and Canadian football player and coach
Ray Smith (baseball) (born 1955), baseball player 
Ray Smith (English footballer, born 1929) (1929–2017), English football wing half for Luton and Southend
Ray Smith (English footballer, born 1934) (born 1934), English football forward for Hull, Peterborough, Northampton and Luton 
Ray Smith (English footballer, born 1943) (born 1943), English football forward for Southend, Wrexham and Peterborough
Ray Gene Smith (1928–2005), American football player
Ray Smith (rugby league), Australian rugby league footballer who played in the 1950s
A. Ray Smith, baseball executive

Others
Ray Smith (actor) (1936–1991), Welsh actor, starred in the TV series Dempsey & Makepeace
Ray Smith (artist) (1949–2018), English sculptor, painter and illustrator
Ray Smith (businessman), American businessman
Ray Smith (author) (born 1941), Canadian writer from Cape Breton
Ray Smith (bishop) (born 1936), Anglican bishop in Australia
Ray Smith (country singer) (1918–1979), American country musician
Ray Smith (rockabilly singer) (1934–1979), rockabilly music pioneer, had hit with "Rockin' Little Angel"
Ray F. Smith (1919–1999), American entomologist and educator
Ray L. Smith, United States Marine Corps major general
Ray Smith (Queensland politician) (1920–2002), member of the Queensland Legislative Assembly
Ray S. Smith Jr. (1924–2007), member of the Arkansas House of Representatives
Ray B. Smith (1867–1939), American lawyer and politician from New York
Ray Smith, software engineer that developed the Tesseract OCR software

See also
Raymond Smith (disambiguation)